Eldon Irl Jenne (May 29, 1899 – February 4, 1993) was an American track and field athlete who competed in the 1920 Summer Olympics and a high school athletic coach.

Athletic career
Jenne attended Coupeville High School in Coupeville, WA where he played football, baseball, and basketball. He later attended Washington State University, where he excelled in the pole vault. In 1920, he was a member of the United States track and field team at the 1920 Summer Olympics in Antwerp, Belgium, finishing seventh in the pole vault competition.

In 1921, Jenne tied for the individual pole vault championship at the NCAA Men's Outdoor Track and Field Championship. He was Washington State's first Olympian and is a member of the Washington State University Sports Hall of Fame.

Coaching career
Following the end of his athletic career, Jenne returned to Portland to coach football, basketball, baseball, and track at Washington High School. In 1928, he coached the boys' basketball team to the Oregon state championship, defeating future University of Oregon football coach Prink Callison's Medford High School team. Jenne's football teams amassed an overall 61–16–14 record with seven Portland city championships, one state championship, with only one losing season.

Jenne also served as head football and basketball coach at Pacific University. He led the Portland Interscholastic League's athletic program from 1938 until his retirement in 1965. In 1983, he was named to the Oregon Sports Hall of Fame for his achievements in coaching.

Jenne died in La Jolla, California in 1993.

Head coaching record

College football

References

1899 births
1993 deaths
American male pole vaulters
Athletes (track and field) at the 1920 Summer Olympics
Olympic track and field athletes of the United States
Pacific Boxers football coaches
Pacific Boxers men's basketball coaches
Washington State Cougars men's track and field athletes
High school baseball coaches in the United States
High school basketball coaches in Oregon
High school football coaches in Oregon
High school track and field coaches in the United States
Washington High School (Portland, Oregon) alumni
Sportspeople from Portland, Oregon
Track and field athletes from Portland, Oregon
Coaches of American football from Oregon
Baseball coaches from Oregon
Basketball coaches from Oregon